The women's 3×5 km classic competition of the 2015 Winter Universiade was held at the Sporting Centre FIS Štrbské Pleso on January 30.

Results

References 

Women's relay